Durand Versus Durand (French: Durand contre Durand) is a 1931 French-German comedy film directed by Eugen Thiele and Léo Joannon and starring Roger Tréville, Paul Asselin and Jeanne Helbling.

The film's sets were designed by the art director Heinrich Richter.

A separate German-language version Einer Frau muß man alles verzeih'n was also released.

Cast
 Roger Tréville as Max Durand I (champagne) 
 Paul Asselin as Max Durand II (couture) 
 Jeanne Helbling as Suzy 
 Clara Tambour as Gaby Pirouette 
 Henri Kerny as Dieudonné 
 Henri Chomette as Le pianiste 
 Jules Mondos as Lévy-Bloch
 Doumel as Le coiffeur 
 Simone Simon as Éliane 
 Mady Berry as Mme Dieudonné

References

Bibliography 
 Philippe Rège. Encyclopedia of French Film Directors, Volume 1. Scarecrow Press, 2009.

External links 
 

1931 films
French comedy films
German comedy films
1931 comedy films
French multilingual films
1930s French-language films
Films directed by Eugen Thiele
Films directed by Léo Joannon
1931 multilingual films
1930s French films
1930s German films